Heart 2 Heart was an Icelandic band. They represented Iceland in the Eurovision Song Contest 1992 with the song Nei eða já. The members of the band were Grétar Örvarsson, Sigga, Sigrún Eva Ármannsdóttir and Friðrik Karlsson.

Icelandic pop music groups
Eurovision Song Contest entrants for Iceland
Eurovision Song Contest entrants of 1992